Elvstrøm 717 is a  sailboat class designed by Paul Elvstrøm and Jan Kjærulff and built in more than 50 copies.

History
The Elvstrøm 717 designed by Paul Elvstrøm and Jan Kjærulff was built by Nordship between 1976 and 1980.

References

1970s sailboat type designs
Sailboat type designs by Danish designers
Sailboat types built in Denmark
Keelboats